Wake Early College of Health and Sciences High School (more commonly known as Wake Early College or WECHS) is a small high school program (grades 9–13, with up to one year of post-secondary education) located on two Wake Tech sites: the Health Sciences Campus and  the North Campus, both in Raleigh, North Carolina. The school provides five years of education in which students can receive a high school diploma, and up to an Associate of Arts, Science, or Applied Sciences degree. The school has an enrollment of roughly 265 students as of the 2011–2012 school year. Although it is a public magnet high school under the Wake County Public School System, it serves no base population and also functions as a part of Wake Tech.

This school is one of six early college high schools in Wake County.  The others are Vernon Malone College and Career Academy, Wake STEM Early College High School, Wake Early College of Information and Biotechnologies, Wake Young Men's Leadership Academy, and Wake Young Women's Leadership Academy (the latter two schools also serve middle school students).

References 

Schools in Wake County, North Carolina
Public high schools in North Carolina
Magnet schools in North Carolina
Schools in Raleigh, North Carolina
Early College High Schools